Trinity Episcopal Church is located in Cheneyville, Louisiana.

Description and history
The church is located in Rapides Parish on the east bank of Bayou Boeuf in a semi–rural setting. The brick building is a five bay basilica. The church is one of twelve examples of  late 19th century Gothic Revival architecture buildings that remain in Louisiana. It was added to the National Register of Historic Places on October 16, 1980.

References

External links
 * 

Churches on the National Register of Historic Places in Louisiana
Gothic Revival church buildings in Louisiana
Churches completed in 1860
19th-century Episcopal church buildings
Churches in Rapides Parish, Louisiana
National Register of Historic Places in Rapides Parish, Louisiana